Hellenic Telecommunications Organisation S.A. (OTE Group) is the largest technology company in Greece. It is one of the three largest companies listed in the Athens Stock Exchange, according to market capitalization.

OTE Group offers fixed-line and mobile telephony, broadband services, pay television and integrated Information and Communications Technology (ICT). At the same time, the Group is involved in a range of activities, notably satellite communications, real-estate and professional training. Formerly a state-owned monopoly, OTE's privatisation started in 1996 and is now listed on the Athens and London Stock Exchanges.

Today, OTE Group employs about 13,000 people in Greece and approximately 20,000 in total. Since July 2009 Deutsche Telekom is the largest shareholder of the company.

Shareholding structure
Starting in 1996, the Greek State gradually decreased its participation in OTE's share capital. Following an agreement between the Greek State and Deutsche Telekom, as of 5 November 2008 each party held 25% plus one share of OTE's share capital. Following a further sale of shares and voting rights, as of 11 July 2011 Deutsche Telekom's stake in OTE has risen to 40% while that of the Greek State amounts to 10%. HRADF announced on 13 February 2018 the opening of a tender procedure for the acquisition of 5% by the Greek state. The competition ended on Friday, 16 March 2018, with no interested parties. On the same day, HDRAF sent a letter to Deutsche Telekom with a proposal to buy back the shares for €284 million, with a 30-day deadline. Deutsche Telekom exercised its right of first refusal and the acquisition was completed in May 2018 through the Stock Exchange. Deutsche Telekom currently holds 51.5% of the company's shares and Government of Greece owns 1.1%.

Subsidiaries

Greece
COSMOTE (100%): Mobile telecommunications services provider. 
OTEGlobe (100%): International carrier with presence in Southeast Europe and a subsidiary of OTE Group. The company provides voice and data services to telecommunication providers and organizations in Greece and abroad.
OTESat-Maritel (94.08%): Satellite services for maritime communications. It is one of the four major providers of Inmarsat maritime satellite communication services in the world.
CosmoOne (61.74%): B2B (Business to business) electronic commerce applications and services – the largest provider in Greece. 
OTEAcademy (100%): Education and advanced vocational training.
OTE Estate (100%): Management of OTE Group's real estate assets.
OTE Insurance Αgency S.A. (100%): A solely owned subsidiary of OTE since 1997, specialized in private insurance. It provides its services to OTE Group, its Human Resources, as well as to the general public.
COSMOTE e-value (100%): Contact Center services.
GERMANOS (100%): Technology products and telecommunications services.
Also owns 11888 and its own telephone directory.

International subsidiaries
Telekom Romania: OTE owns 54% of the share capital of the main telecommunications operator in Romania, providing integrated fixed-line services (voice, broadband, data and leased lines) and satellite TV services to the local market.

Financial data
For 2021, the Group announced turnover of €3,368.3 million, for an increase of 3.4%. Adjusted EBITDA reached €1,295.9 million, with the EBITDA margin increasing to 38.5%. Adjusted free cash flow came to €590.1 million. The Group's adjusted net debt fell by 25.0%, corresponding to 0.6 times the annual adjusted EBITDA (AL).

History
OTE was founded on 23 October 1949 as a successor to the Hellenic Telephone Company (AETE), which was established in 1926, with the aim of consolidating all such public and private telecommunications companies. Formerly, telephony, telegraph, domestic and international connections were fragmented and under-coordinated.

Until 1998, the Greek telecommunications market was a monopoly. The market was opened to competitors and OTE was gradually privatized. Along with other telecommunications market providers, OTE is regulated by the National Telecommunications and Post Commission (EETT).

In 2007, Marfin Investment Group acquired 20% of the company, while in March 2008, sold it to German Deutsche Telekom, which later increased its stake to 25% plus one, matching that of the state.

Following the sale of a further 5% in 2009 and another 10% in 2011 of OTE's share capital by the Greek state to Deutsche Telekom, the state holds 10% and DT 40%. In 2018, Deutsche Telekom acquired an additional 5% of OTE as it exercised the right of first refusal to acquire 24,507,520 ordinary shares as announced by HDRAF.

1949–1964
23 October 1949: ΟΤΕ S.A. is founded (Legislative Decree 1049/49)
The first Greek telephone directory is published.
The TELEX service becomes operational.

1965–1989
The Greek long-distance telephone network is automated.
Laying of the submarine cable Greece-Italy MED 3 is completed.
The first antenna of the Centre of Satellite Communication in Thermopylae (the 6th in Europe) is set up.
The first fully digitised switching centres (long-distance and hub) of the EWSD/SIEMENS system are established.

1990–2000
ΟΤΕ expands to the Balkans, SE Europe and the Middle East.
ΟΤΕ is listed in the Athens Exchange (ASE).
OTE is listed on the New York Stock Exchange (NYSE).
OTE acquires an initial 35% stake in RomTelecom, the incumbent telephony company in Romania.
Acquires GSM License in Bulgaria and establishes Globul to exploit this license.

2000–2007
Satellite Hellas Sat2 is launched from Cape Canaveral.
OTE launches ADSL services in the Greek market.
OTE and COSMOTE act as Grand National Sponsors of the Athens 2004 Olympic Games.
OTE signs agreement to sell 90% of its holdings in ArmenTel (now Telecom Armenia) for approximately €342 million.
The Greek State sells 10.7% of OTE share capital to institutional investors.
OTE makes available new speeds reaching 24Mbit/s.

2008–2010
OTE launches CONN-X TV (IPTV) to a limited number of existing clients for a trial period. This satellite TV was the predecessor of OTE TV. 
OTE's broadband connection reach 970,000, with presence points in its network extend to 1,390, nationwide.
The agreement between the Greek Government and Deutsche Telekom is signed, according to which, since 5 November, each will own 25% plus one share of OTE's share capital.
OTE acquires 100% of COSMOTE and its share is listed on the Athens Stock Exchange.
COSMOTE now owns 100% of GERMANOS SA, the leading retailer of telecommunications in the wider region of Southeast Europe.
Completion of the sale of COSMOFON in the former Yugoslav Republic of Macedonia held by COSMOTE.
After the sale of an additional 5% of the Greek State's shares and voting rights, Deutsche Telekom's stake in OTE stands at 30% while the Greek State holds 20%. COSMOTE completes acquisition of Telemobil S.A. (Zapp) in Romania.
OTE introduces Conn-x TV, which is based on IPTV technology.
Michael Tsamaz, CEO of OTE Group's mobile arm COSMOTE, assumes the position of OTE President & CEO.
OTE delists from the New York Stock Exchange (NYSE).

2011–2017
Deutsche Telekom acquires an extra 10% of OTE share capital raising its stake to 40%.
The company signs three-year Collective Labour Agreement with the Federation of OTE Employees OME-OTE, achieving personnel costs reduction and securing employment for OTE regular employees.
Introduces OTE TV via Satellite and integrates all of the pay TV services it offers under the brand name OTE TV.
OTE signs agreement for the sale of the minority stake in Telekom Srbija, of which owns 20%, for about €400 million.
Launches reduced prices of up to 25% for Double Play Unlimited Plans that combine Internet and unlimited telephony to fixed lines.
OTE TV subscriber base reaches 100.000, following the continuous strengthening of the platform with new channels, services and HD content.
Launches new VDSL Internet services, with speeds up to 50 Mbit/s.
Successfully completes two Voluntary Redundancy Schemes, the incentives of which 1,516 people in the company accepted.
Raises €700 million through 5-year fixed coupon notes, following the successful completion of a bookbuilding process. 
Announces the signing of an agreement to sell its 99.05% stake in Hellas Sat, to Arabsat, for 208 million euros, plus 7 million in dividends.
Announces the signing of an agreement to sell its 100% stake in Cosmo Bulgaria Mobile EAD (Globul) and Germanos Telecom Bulgaria (Germanos) to Telenor, the Norwegian telecom operator. The agreement consideration reached €717 million (enterprise value). 
OTE announced the expansion of its VDSL network with 367 local exchanges and 2,732 outdoor cabins activated in October and extending VDSL availability to 1.3 million households and businesses.
On 26 October 2015 it establishes COSMOTE as a single brand for all its products and services.
In 2017, OTE's management announced that priority is to develop fiber optic networks and that total investment for the period until 2020 will amount to €1.5 billion.

OTE Telecoms Museum
The Museum of Telecommunications opened up to the public in 1990. It is housed in a 1000 m2 privately owned OTE building, in the district of 25 Proteos str., 14564 New Kifissia – Athens. The purpose of the Museum is the research, study and documentation of historical data pertaining to the evolution of telecommunications from ancient times to the present day. The Museum is a member of the International Committee for the Conservation of the Industrial Heritage (T.I.C.C.I.H.).

References

Internet service providers of Greece
Internet service providers of the United States
Telecommunications companies established in 1949
Greek brands
Marousi
Companies listed on the Athens Exchange
Deutsche Telekom
Former government-owned companies of Greece
Greek companies established in 1949